The 2004 United States House of Representatives elections in Kansas were held on November 2, 2004 to determine who will represent the state of Kansas in the United States House of Representatives. Kansas has four seats in the House, apportioned according to the 2000 United States Census. Representatives are elected for two-year terms.

Overview

References 

2004 Kansas elections
Kansas
2004